Duponchelia naitoi is a moth in the family Crambidae. It was described by Sasaki in 2008. It is found in Japan.

References

Moths described in 2008
Spilomelinae